Monster Rancher Battle Card GB, known in Japan as  is a handheld game released in 1999 for the Nintendo Game Boy Color system. It is the first game in Tecmo's Monster Rancher Battle Card series, featuring a card game incorporating the popular characters from the Monster Rancher series. It was followed by Monster Rancher Battle Card Episode II for the Sony PlayStation entertainment system which featured additional monsters.

Gameplay
Although the Monster Rancher series is known for the ability to import game content via CDs, Monster Rancher Battle Card GB has no equivalent functionality.  Instead, the player takes a short "personality test" to determine his starting deck and then can win additional cards by defeating opponents as well as new monster cards by defeating dungeon bosses.  While a code system is also in place, only a select few cards catering to a single monster along with some general support can be obtained through this method.

Each player's deck consists of three monster cards and an additional fifty attack/defense/support cards.  Monster cards start in play, have HP, and a type (either ground or air).  Attack are always specific to one monster breed, defense cards can be specific to one monster breed, and support cards.  To use these cards, a player usually has to pay an activation cost in the form of a resource called "guts".

The actual card game with both players, each with their three monsters on the field, flipping a coin to determine which player has the choice of going first or second.  Each player then draws five cards.  A player's turn consists of (in the following order):
A) A draw phase: The active player draws until he has five cards in hand)
B) A general phase: The active player can attack or use support cards.  At this time the defending player can use defense cards to counter an opponent's attack)
C) The discard phase: The active player can discard any number of cards from their hand.  Those discarded cards become "guts", which can be used to pay for attacks.

A monster is killed when its HP reaches 0.  A player loses when they have no monsters remaining or when they are unable to draw a card.

The game consists of a character traveling to dungeons to obtain sacred stones needed to generate new monster cards and fighting ranked battles to increase their level to unlock new dungeons.  Each dungeon contains multiple randomly generated floors, invisible guardians that automatically challenge the player, normal NPCs that the player can challenge, and a boss.  After achieving the maximum rank and completing all the dungeons, a new dungeon is discovered and after defeating its boss a player has the option of starting a new game+ during which his normal deck is locked until he reaches the final dungeon.  There's no actual story or objectives beyond unlocking content.

Reception

The game received "mixed" reviews according to the review aggregation website GameRankings. In Japan, Famitsu gave it a score of 22 out of 40.

References

External links
 Monster Rancher Metropolis
 

1999 video games
Digital collectible card games
Game Boy Color games
Monster Rancher
Game Boy Color-only games
Tecmo games
Video games developed in Japan